Cisco High School is a public high school located in Cisco, Texas, United States and classified as a 2A school by the University Interscholastic League (UIL).  It is part of the Cisco Independent School District located in western Eastland County.   In 2013, the school was rated "Met Standard" by the Texas Education Agency.

Athletics
The Cisco Loboes compete in the following sports 

Cross Country, Football, Basketball, Golf, Tennis, Track, Softball & Baseball

State Titles
Football  
2013(2A/D2)
Boys Golf 
2001(2A)
Girls Track 
2001(2A), 2002(2A)

References

External links
Cisco ISD

Public high schools in Texas
Schools in Eastland County, Texas